David's Reformed Church is a historic Reformed church at 80 W. Columbus Street in Canal Winchester, Ohio.

The Gothic Revival church building was constructed in 1881 and added to the National Register of Historic Places in 1989.  The church is currently affiliated with the United Church of Christ.

References

External links
Official website

United Church of Christ churches in Ohio
Churches on the National Register of Historic Places in Ohio
Gothic Revival church buildings in Ohio
Churches completed in 1881
Churches in Franklin County, Ohio
National Register of Historic Places in Franklin County, Ohio
1881 establishments in Ohio